Ciara Janson is an English actress. She is best known for her role as Nicole Owen on Hollyoaks.

Career

The gurgling over at 18 months launched Ciara's career as a voice over artist and spurred Hobson's International, an acting agency, to launch a children's division. Ciara became the youngest child to have a regular radio spot in a show named 'Victoria' when she was five years old. Ciara feels most at ease when she is in the voice over booth.

Janson's first major television work was as Nicole Owen on Hollyoaks. Previous parts include the role of Heidi for a BBC radio drama. She left Hollyoaks in September 2006. Janson made her theatrical debut in Bad Blood at the Key Theatre. She made her West End debut in 2009, playing Louise in New Boy at Trafalgar Studios.

Janson is a prolific voice-over artist, and is a regular voice on BBC Three, and her extensive radio credits include Disney's new version of The Famous Five and various dramas for BBC Radio 4. She also appears as the Doctor's companion, Amy, in a trilogy of linked Doctor Who audio dramas, beginning with The Judgement of Isskar. She voiced Lucy who speaks American with an American accent in the US version by Lobster Films in the Millimages American  animated series 64 Zoo Lane, from 1999–2000.

Television

Film

Stage

Radio

Personal life
She is married to Swedish singer, Eurovision Song Contest 2015 winner and presenter Måns Zelmerlöw. They became engaged in late 2017. In December 2017, Zelmerlöw revealed to Swedish press that the couple were expecting a child together. A few weeks later he confirmed that they would be having a baby boy. The couple welcomed Albert on 25 May 2018. Janson also has a son (Archie) from a previous relationship. They were married on 5 September 2019 and live in London. On 9 August 2022, it was announced on Instagram that she had given birth to her third son, second with Zelmerlöw, Ossian Matteus Zelmerlöw.

References

External links

Audio/video
Ciara Janson audio showreels (mp3)

Press
Interview with Ciara Janson in the Leighton-Linslade Citizen (Leighton Buzzard Observer) from 2006
Ciara Janson (young) in Hello

1987 births
Living people
English child actresses
English stage actresses
English soap opera actresses
English television actresses
English voice actresses
People educated at Epsom College
Actresses from Surrey